An online artwork proofing, feedback, review and approval tool is a web-based collaborative software that helps studios with internal and client communication.

How it works
Users are allowed to upload files to a central repository where other users are allowed to mark up, annotate, add comments and/or approve them.

Features
 View online multimedia files: images, videos and documents.
 Mark up files
 Version control
 Comment threads
 User profiles
 User permissions
 Email notifications

Technology
Many tools are developed with a combination of HTML with Adobe Flash, AJAX or Microsoft Silverlight.

Alternatives
 Email 
 Meetings
 Phone
 Web conferencing
 FTP

Benefits
 Get accurate feedback on work-in-progress design pieces.
 Saves time for the studio and their clients
 Prevents interpretation mistakes.
 Allows studios to have all the information that was sent/received in a central place. 
 Enables a person in a different place and/or time zone to give/receive feedback

See also
 Collaborative software
 Digital asset management
 Online proofing
 Prepress proofing

Electronic publishing